The 2002 1. divisjon, Norway's second-tier football league, began play on 14 April 2002 and ended on 27 October 2002. The league was contested by 16 teams, and the top two teams won promotion to Tippeligaen, while the third placed played a promotion-playoff against the 12th-placed team in Tippeligaen to win promotion. The bottom four teams were relegated to the 2. divisjon.

Tromsø and Aalesund won promotion to Tippeligaen, while Ham-Kam lost the promotion-playoff against Bryne. Åsane, Tromsdalen, Lørenskog and Tollnes was relegated to the 2. divisjon.

League table

References

Norwegian First Division seasons
2
Norway
Norway